Kevin Hudson (born July 2, 1965) is an American visual effects artist and film director.

Biography
Kevin Hudson is an American Filmmaker and Digital Artist who is currently part of the team at Walt Disney Animation Studios. His work can be found in some of the studio's recent biggest hits including Big Hero 6, Zootopia and Moana. Before making the leap into the world of Digital Effects, Kevin worked in traditional special effects on such films as Edward Scissorhands, Predator 2, and The Addams Family. His latest film, Weeds (animated short), an all-CG animation short film, marks his debut as writer and director. His Weeds (animated short) project is also the first animated short film completed within the Filmmakers Co-op at Disney Feature Animation. Examples of his work may be found at his Online Portfolio www.kevinhudsonproductions.com

Partial filmography

 Weeds (animated short) (2017) 
 Rush (2013) 
 Les Misérables (2012) 
 The Dark Knight Rises (2012) 
 John Carter (2012) 
 I Am Legend (2007) 
 Spider-Man 3 (2007)
 Superman Returns (2006)
 The Polar Express (2004) 
 Stuart Little 2 (2002) 
 Men in Black II (2002) 
 The Chubbchubbs! (2002) 
 Harry Potter and the Sorcerer's Stone (2001) 
 Hollow Man (2000) 
 Stuart Little (1999) 
 Contact (1997) 
 James and the Giant Peach (1996) 
 Congo (1995) 
 Star Trek VI: The Undiscovered Country (1991) 
 The Addams Family (1991) 
 Edward Scissorhands  (1990) 
 Predator 2 (1990)
 Darkman (1990)

References

External links
Kevin Hudson Online Portfolio

 Short “Weeds” from Disney Co-op Screens at VanArts at VanArts
 Alumnus creates evocative short film featuring refugee dandelion at Daily Bruin
 Kevin Hudson Asset Artist at Walt Disney Animation Studios at Gnomon School of Visual Effects

American film directors
1965 births
Living people